A garden ornament is an item used for garden, landscape, and park enhancement and decoration. Garden ornaments include:
bench
bird baths
bird feeders
birdhouses 
columns – cast stone
fire basket
flower box
window box
fountains
jardiniere
kugel fountain
garden furniture
gazing spheres
hanging baskets
landscape lighting – decorative fixtures
lawn ornaments
bathtub madonnas
concrete geese
garden gnomes
lawn jockeys
yard globe
plastic pink flamingos
outdoor candle
outdoor fireplace
outdoor sculpture
sculpture trail
found objects such as recycled bowling balls, toilet planters, antique farm equipment
kinetic sculpture
masks
obelisks
renewable energy sculpture
pagoda – small versions
pedestals – e.g. terracotta, cast stone
pond – rocks and boulders with basins
pots
urns
ceramic art vases
rain chains
sundials
topiary specimens
waterfalls – small prefabricated type
weathervanes
wind chimes

History
Early examples of the use of garden ornaments in western culture were seen in Ancient Roman gardens such as those excavated at Pompeii and Herculaneum. The Italian Renaissance garden and French formal garden styles were the peak of using created forms in the garden and landscape, with high art and kitsch interpretations ever since. The English landscape garden expanded the scale of some garden ornaments to temple follies

The Asian tradition of making garden ornaments, often functioning in association with Feng Shui principles, has a nearly timeless history. Chinese gardens with Chinese scholar's rocks, Korean stone art, and Japanese gardens with Suiseki and Zen rock gardens have and symbolic meaning and natural ornamental qualities.

See also
Ornament (architecture)
Ornamental plant
Ornamental tree
Garden design
Garden feature

External links
Guide to garden ornaments

 01
Garden features
Gardening lists
Design-related lists